Wanisekara Bandaranayake Wasala Mudiyanse Ralahamilage Aluwihare Uda Walauwe Alick Aluwihare (commonly known as Alick Aluwihare; 20 December 1926 – 17 May 2009) was a Sri Lankan politician belonging to the United National Party. He was a Sri Lankan Cabinet Minister. He was a Minister of Post & Telecommunication and Minister of Ports & Shipping in the Premadasa cabinet. He was the Home Affairs and Local Government Minister in the Ranil Wickramasinghe Cabinet in 2001 . He was elected to the  Sri Lankan Parliament Eight Times from Matale Electoral District.

Personal life
Alick Aluwihare was born in Matale to William Aluwihare a Sri Lankan Government Official and Aluwihare Kumarihamy on December 20, 1926. He was a student of Vijaya College, Matale and later joined St. Thomas' College, Matale. He had an arranged married to Jinawathie a student of Hillwood college on May 9, 1957. He has five children including Ranjith Aluwihare, Wasantha Aluwihare and Daljith Aluwihare who are also Sri Lankan politicians.

Political career
He entered Sri Lankan Parliament by winning a bye election in 1961 from Matale replacing his uncle Bernard Aluwihare who had died. He was member of the Sri Lankan Parliament for nearly 40 years till death in 2009 winning every election except 1970 when he was defeated by 650 votes.

References

Members of the 5th Parliament of Ceylon
Members of the 6th Parliament of Ceylon
Members of the 8th Parliament of Sri Lanka
Members of the 9th Parliament of Sri Lanka
Members of the 10th Parliament of Sri Lanka
Members of the 11th Parliament of Sri Lanka
Members of the 12th Parliament of Sri Lanka
Members of the 13th Parliament of Sri Lanka
1926 births
2009 deaths
United National Party politicians
People from Central Province, Sri Lanka
Deputy ministers of Sri Lanka
Local government and provincial councils ministers of Sri Lanka
Posts ministers of Sri Lanka
Telecommunication ministers of Sri Lanka
Shipping ministers of Sri Lanka
Alumni of Vijaya College, Matale